The Mississippian (also known as Lower Carboniferous or Early Carboniferous) is a subperiod in the geologic timescale or a subsystem of the geologic record. It is the earlier of two subperiods of the Carboniferous period lasting from roughly 358.9 to 323.2 million years ago. As with most other geochronologic units, the rock beds that define the Mississippian are well identified, but the exact start and end dates are uncertain by a few million years. The Mississippian is so named because rocks with this age are exposed in the Mississippi Valley.

The Mississippian was a period of marine transgression in the Northern Hemisphere: the sea level was so high that only the Fennoscandian Shield and the Laurentian Shield were dry land. The cratons were surrounded by extensive delta systems and lagoons, and carbonate sedimentation on the surrounding continental platforms, covered by shallow seas.

In North America, where the interval consists primarily of marine limestones, it is treated as a geologic period between the Devonian and the Pennsylvanian. During the Mississippian an important phase of orogeny occurred in the Appalachian Mountains.  The USGS geologic time scale shows its relation to other periods.

In Europe, the Mississippian and Pennsylvanian are grouped together as the Carboniferous system, and traditionally referred to as the Upper Carboniferous and Lower Carboniferous instead.

Subdivisions
In the official geologic timescale, the Mississippian is subdivided into three stages:
Serpukhovian ( to  mya)
Visean ( to  mya)
Tournaisian ( to  mya)

The lower two come from European stratigraphy, the top from Russian stratigraphy. Besides Europe and Russia, there are many local subdivisions that are used as alternatives for the international timescale. In the North American system, the Mississippian is subdivided into four stages:
Chesterian (top of the Visean plus the Serpukhovian)
Meramecian (middle Visean)
Osagean (top of the Tournaisian and bottom of the Visean)
Kinderhookian (the lower two-thirds of the Tournaisian)

References

External links

 
 

 
01
Geological epochs